Faris Aditama (born 19 February 1988) is an Indonesian professional footballer who plays as a winger for Liga 1 club Persik Kediri.

Club career

Persik Kediri
He was signed for Persik Kediri to play in Liga 2 in the 2019 season. On 25 November 2019 Persik successfully won the 2019 Liga 2 Final and was promoted to Liga 1, after defeating Persita Tangerang 3–2 at the Kapten I Wayan Dipta Stadium, Gianyar.

Honours

Club
Persik Kediri
 Liga 2: 2019

References

External links
 Faris Aditama at Soccerway

1988 births
Living people
Indonesian footballers
Liga 1 (Indonesia) players
Liga 2 (Indonesia) players
Persik Kediri players
Persepam Madura Utama players
Dewa United F.C. players
Association football midfielders
People from Kediri (city)
Sportspeople from East Java